Bernardino Poccetti (26 August 1548 – 10 October 1612), also known as Barbatelli, was an Italian Mannerist painter and printmaker of etchings.

Biography
Born in Florence, he was initially trained as a decorator of facades and ceilings, enrolling in 1570 in the Florentine painters guild for such work, the Accademia delle Arti del Disegno, (Academy of the Arts of Drawing). He is also referred to as: Bernardino Barbatelli  or Bernardino delle Grottesche, delle Facciate, or delle Muse. He initially worked in the shop of Michele Tosini, and he participated in the broadly shared decoration of the Chiostro Grande of Santa Maria Novella in the 1580s. In 1583–85, he helped decorate panegyric frescoes for the Palazzo Capponi. He also completed frescoes in San Pier Maggiore in San Pierino.

In 1592–93, he worked on frescoes in the Certosa di Galluzzo relating to  Life and Death of San Bruno. He painted scenes from the life of founder of the Convent of the Servites for the Annunziata. He painted scenes from the Life of St. Anthony (fresco) for San Marco. He frescoed scenes from the Life of Cosimo I as decoration of great Salon of the Pitti Palace. He also labored for other charterhouses in Pisa and Siena. He also painted frescoes, considered his masterpiece, in the Cappella del Giglio (Cappella Neri, 1599) in Santa Maria Maddalena dei Pazzi.

In his later works, he is considered one of the Florentine reformers—the so-called Counter-Maniera (Counter-Mannerism)—along with Santi di Tito, Domenico Cresti (Il Passignano), Lodovico Cigoli, Jacopo Chimenti da Empoli, Andrea Boscoli, and Gregorio Pagani. Among the painters he trained or influenced was Michelangelo Cinganelli.

Other works
Palazzo Usimbardi (now Palazzo Acciaiuoli (1603))
Santissima Annunziata di Pistoia Pistoia (1601)
Cloister of Sant'Antonino in San Marco, Florence (1602)
Massacre of the Innocents, Ospedale degli Innocenti, Florence (1610)

Gallery

Frescoes for Communicatorio of Sant'Apollonia

Frescoes for vaults of Ospedale degli Innocenti, Florence

Frescoes for Great Cloister, Santissima Annunziata, Florence

References

1548 births
1612 deaths
16th-century Italian painters
Italian male painters
17th-century Italian painters
Painters from Florence
Mannerist painters
Italian printmakers
Italian decorators